Earl Felton (1909–1972) was an American screenwriter.

He was a regular collaborator with Richard Fleischer, who later wrote that "Earl was crippled from childhood with polio. He had no use of his legs, but he navigated beautifully with a crutch and cane... Earl normally hated anybody [helping]... him and would sometimes lay about him with his cane."

Fleischer added that "in spite of his lifeless legs and total reliance of a crutch and cane to get around, Felton was much given to self-indulgences and debaucheries."

Career
He sold the story Freshman Love to Warner Bros B movie unit. He also sold the story Man Hunt.

His story The Wizard of St Germaine was sold but not made.

His story The Bengal Killer was filmed as The Bengal Tiger.

In August 1937 he was reported working on a script Half Way House for MGM.

World Premiere (1941) was based on an original scenario by Felton.

In 1942 he wrote Heart of the Golden West for Roy Rogers.

In 1944 he sold A Likely Story to MGM. He wrote Pardon My Past for Fred MacMurray.

In 1947 he sold a novelette of his, Another Dawn, to Republic. It became Drums Along the Amazon.

He sold The Odyssey of Eddie Arcaro to MGM as a vehicle for Robert Taylor. He wrote the original story for The Beautiful Blonde from Bashful Bend.

Richard Fleischer
Felton began working with Richard Fleischer on Trapped. They went on to collaborate on Armored Car Robbery, His Kind of Woman, and Target which became The Narrow Margin.

He sold an original to Columbia, Feather in the Breeze.

Fleischer took Felton with him when they left RKO to work on The Happy Time. After The Happy Time he was to write and produce The Right Size of Me for Fleischer about the Doss family but it was not made. They were also meant to make Full of Life for Stanley Kramer but it was never filmed.

They did collaborate on 20,000 Leagues Under the Sea (1954) for Disney and Bandido for Robert Mitchum.

He wrote The Catwalk for MGM, Line of Fire for John Champion, The Lawless Decade for David L. Wolper and The Proving Flight for Fleischer.

Kramer used him on The Pride and the Passion (1957). The producer got him to do a draft of Inherit the Wind.

In 1960 Fleischer was going to direct a musical script by Felton, Willing is My Love starring Joni James. He did another for Fleischer, One Minute to Midnight. He wrote a film about LSD, East of the Moon. He wrote We Sing Tomorrow for Mort Sahl. None of these films were made.

In the mid 1960s he produced The Man from UNCLE.

In 1969 he wrote Brutes in Brass for GMF but it was not made.

Selected filmography
Freshman Love (1936) – screenplay
Man Hunt (1936) – story
 Bengal Tiger (1936) – story and screenplay
 The Captain's Kid (1936) – story
Bad Guy (1937) – screenplay
 Prison Nurse (1938) – screenplay
 The Night Hawk (1938) – screenplay
 Orphans of the Street (1938) – story
 Society Smugglers (1939) – screenplay
Smuggled Cargo (1939) – additional dialogue
Calling All Marines (1939) – screenplay
The Lone Wolf Keeps a Date (1940) – story, screenplay
The Lone Wolf Takes a Chance – story, screenplay
 World Premiere (1941) – story, screenplay
 The Pittsburgh Kid (1941) – screenplay
Sierra Sue (1942) – screenplay
 Sunset Serenade (1942) – screenplay
Heart of the Golden West (1942) – screenplay
My Best Gal (1944) – screenplay
 Pardon My Past (1945) – screenplay
Criminal Court' (1946) – story
 Drums Along the Amazon (1948) – storyThe Beautiful Blonde from Bashful Bend (1949) – story, screenplayTrapped (1949) – story
 Armoured Car Robbery (1950) – screenplay
 His Kind of Woman (1951) – uncredited contribution to script
 The Las Vegas Story (1952) – screenplay
 The Narrow Margin (1952) – screenplayThe Happy Time (1952) – screenplay, associate producer – nominated Best Comedy 1953 Screen Writers Guild20,000 Leagues Under the Sea (1954) – screenplayThe Marauders (1955) – screenplayThe Rawhide Years (1956) – screenplayBandido! (1956) – story, screenplayThe Pride and the Passion (1958) – uncredited contribution to scriptKillers of Kilimanjaro (1959) – screenplayThe Felony Squad (1967) – "No Sad Songs for Charlie"

References

Bibliography
 Shelley, Peter. Frances Farmer: The Life and Films of a Troubled Star''. McFarland, 2010.

External links

1909 births
1972 deaths
People from Studio City, Los Angeles
Screenwriters from California
20th-century American screenwriters